Lepipaschia limbata is a species of snout moth in the genus Lepipaschia. It was described by Jay C. Shaffer and M. Alma Solis in 1994. It is known from Burkina Faso, West Africa.

References

Moths described in 1994
Epipaschiinae